Cliona Manahan has been the Irish Ambassador to the Czech Republic and the Ukraine since September 2019. From 2014 until 2019, she was Ambassador of Ireland to Denmark and Iceland and was Consul General of Ireland to Scotland. 

Manahan graduated from Trinity College Dublin, earning a BA in Legal Science.

Manahan is married to Christopher Mark Leslie, son of Desmond Leslie, and they have two children: Luke Daniel Leslie (b. 1987) and Leah Leslie (b. 1992).

References

Irish women ambassadors
Ambassadors of Ireland to Ukraine
Ambassadors of Ireland to Denmark
Ambassadors of Ireland to Iceland
Ambassadors of Ireland to the Czech Republic
Alumni of Trinity College Dublin
Year of birth missing (living people)
Living people